KCC may refer to:

Education
 Kankakee Community College, a college in Kankakee, Illinois
 Kansas Christian College (Overland Park), a college in Overland Park, Kansas
 Kapiolani Community College, a college in Honolulu, Hawaii
 Kellogg Community College, a college in Battle Creek, Michigan
 Kensington and Chelsea College, a College in West London, United Kingdom
 Kentucky Christian College, the former name of Kentucky Christian University
 Kingsborough Community College, a college in Brooklyn, New York
 King Charles Club, a dining society at the University of Oxford
 Kingsthorpe Community College, now known simply as Kingsthorpe College
 Kirtland Community College, a public college in Roscommon in Northern Michigan
 Klamath Community College, in Klamath Falls, Oregon
 Kiangsu-Chekiang College
 Kiangsu-Chekiang College (Shatin), a secondary school in Shatin, Hong Kong
 Kiangsu-Chekiang College (Kwai Chung), a secondary school in Kwai Chung, Hong Kong
 Kiangsu-Chekiang College, International Section, a secondary school in Braemar Hill, North Point, Hong Kong

Organizations
 KCC Corporation, a Korean chemical manufacturer
 Kampala City Council, the local government authority in Kampala, Uganda
 Katoomba Christian Convention, an interdenominational ministry providing Bible preaching
 Kent County Council
 Kerala Council of Churches, an ecumenical organization in India
 Khulna City Corporation, a city corporation in Bangladesh
 King County Council, the government of King County in the state of Washington, United States of America
 Korea Communications Commission, a South Korean central government organization

Places
 KCC Mall, a shopping mall in the Philippines
 Kandy City Centre,  a commercial and a shopping complex in Kandy, Sri Lanka
 Kigali Convention Centre, a convention centre in Kigali

Science and technology
 Chloride potassium symporter
 Korea Computer Center, the leading North Korean government computer research center

Other uses
 Kampala City Council FC, a Ugandan football (soccer) club
 Kansas City Chiefs, a National Football League team based in Missouri
 Kirby: Canvas Curse, a Nintendo DS video game
 Kowloon Cricket Club, a cricket club and social club in Kowloon, Hong Kong
 Keung Chit Chit, a Hong Kong singer and song composer